Mi amor frente al pasado, is a Mexican telenovela that aired on  Canal 4, Telesistema Mexicano in 1960, with episodes of 30 minutes duration. Starring Silvia Derbez and Joaquín Cordero.

Cast 
 Silvia Derbez
 Joaquín Cordero
 Anita Blanch
 Lulú Parga
 Manola Saavedra
 Roberto Cañedo

Production 
The musical theme (Un hombre...una mujer) was given by Francis Lai.
The novel is based on the original work of Kenya Perea and adapted by herself
The telenovela is etched in black and white.

References 

1960 telenovelas
Mexican telenovelas
Televisa telenovelas
Television shows set in Mexico City
1960 Mexican television series debuts
1960 Mexican television series endings
Spanish-language telenovelas